The Freedom Cup is a minor international rugby union trophy contested between South Africa and New Zealand, during The Rugby Championship and previously during The Rugby Championship's predecessor, the Tri Nations. It was first contested in 2004 (the 10 year anniversary of South African democracy), in a one-off test. The game, played at Ellis Park, Johannesburg was won 40–26 by South Africa. However, in the 2006 Tri Nations Series, it was contested in all three New Zealand–South Africa matches.

In 2006, New Zealand won the first two matches, winning the Freedom Cup for the first time, but during the post-match presentation following the third game which was won by South Africa, Supersport presenter Joost van der Westhuizen incorrectly presented the trophy to Springbok captain John Smit who accepted it in front of millions of television viewers. The mistake was later corrected, off-air.

Matches

Source:

Results

See also

History of rugby union matches between New Zealand and South Africa

Notes

References

External links
Boks and ABs to contest new cup - tvnz.co.nz
Pick and Go Freedom Cup stats
News24:Joost in Freedom Cup shocker

History of rugby union matches between New Zealand and South Africa
International rugby union competitions hosted by New Zealand
International rugby union competitions hosted by South Africa
The Rugby Championship trophies
2004 establishments in New Zealand
2004 establishments in South Africa